Martin Krusemann (also Martin Kruusemann or Martin Kruusimaa; 10 November 1883 Sindi, Kreis Pernau – 1957 Baltimore, United States) was an Estonian politician. He was a member of II Riigikogu, representing the Farmers' Assemblies. He was a member of the Riigikogu since 7 October 1925. He replaced Aleksander Lensman. On 7 November 1925, he resigned his position and he was replaced by Johann Ploompuu.

References

1883 births
1957 deaths
People from Sindi, Estonia
People from Kreis Pernau
Farmers' Assemblies politicians
Members of the Riigikogu, 1923–1926
Estonian World War II refugees
Estonian emigrants to the United States